Eckert Field Airport is a general aviation airport located  northeast of Strathmore, California.

History 
During World War II, the airport was designated as Trauger Auxiliary Field (A-5)).  It was used by the United States Army Air Forces as an auxiliary training airfield for the flying school at Rankin Field, California.

See also
 California World War II Army Airfields

References 

 Eckert Field Airport
 www.airfieldsdatabase.com

Airports in Tulare County, California
Airfields of the United States Army Air Forces in California
USAAF Contract Flying School Airfields